Francesco de' Medici (16 October 1614 – 25 July 1634) was the fourth son of Grand Duke Cosimo II of Tuscany and his wife, Maria Maddalena of Austria. He died unmarried.

Biography

Prince Francesco was born at the Palazzo Pitti in Florence, the capital of his father's grand duchy. The Medici family had been connected to Tuscany for over three centuries and had been its sovereign rulers since 1569. Little is known about his childhood, other than that he was raised alongside his brother Mattias. He was a Tuscan prince by birth and entitled to the style of Highness. His siblings included the future Duchess of Parma, Archduchess Anna of Austria and Grand Duke Ferdinando II, himself father of the penultimate Medici grand duke.

He pursued a military career. Along with his mother and Mattias, he visited Austria in 1631 in order to meet his uncle the Emperor Ferdinand II. He fought in the Battle of Lützen during the Thirty Years' War but fled the scene. His elder brother, Grand Duke Ferdinando, reprimanded him for his conduct in a letter dated 14 July. He died from plague during the Siege of Ratisbon, 1634.

Ancestors

References

Citations

Bibliography
Young, G. F., The Medici: Volume 3, E. P. Dutton and Company, 1920

External links

Francesco
Tuscan princes
1614 births
1634 deaths
Nobility from Florence
17th-century Italian nobility
Italian people of the Thirty Years' War
17th-century deaths from plague (disease)
Military personnel from Florence
Sons of monarchs